Eric Dean Coleman (born May 26, 1951)  is a Democratic politician in the United States. He served as state senator of Connecticut's 2nd District, representing Bloomfield, Hartford, and Windsor. He served as a state representative from 1983 to 1994, and held the position of Deputy President Pro Tempore in the Connecticut Senate.

Coleman is a graduate of Pomfret School, Columbia University, and the University of Connecticut School of Law.

In 2001, he became the first African-American to chair the Judiciary Committee, and now held the chairmanship of the Planning and Development Committee.

Coleman resigned from the Senate in 2017, and was subsequently nominated and then confirmed as a Superior Court judge in 2018.

On November 30, 2022, Coleman announced that he would run for Mayor of Hartford in 2023, following mayor Luke Bronin's decision to retire.

See also

Connecticut Senate

References

External links
Eric D. Coleman official website
Connecticut General Assembly - Eric D. Coleman bills introduced
Project Vote Smart - Representative Eric D. Coleman (CT) profile
Follow the Money - Eric D Coleman
2006 2004 2002 2000 1998 1996 campaign contributions

Democratic Party Connecticut state senators
1951 births
Living people
Columbia University alumni
University of Connecticut School of Law alumni
African-American state legislators in Connecticut
People from Bloomfield, Connecticut
Democratic Party members of the Connecticut House of Representatives
21st-century American politicians
Pomfret School alumni
21st-century African-American politicians
20th-century African-American people